The 2015–16 Boise State Broncos men's basketball team represented Boise State University during the 2015–16 NCAA Division I men's basketball season. The Broncos, led by sixth year head coach Leon Rice, played their home games at Taco Bell Arena and were a member of the Mountain West Conference. They finished the season 20–12, 11–7 in Mountain West play to finish in third place. They lost in the first round of the Mountain West tournament to Colorado State. Despite having 20 wins, they did not participate in a postseason tournament after declining an invitation from the inaugural Vegas 16.

Previous season
The Broncos finished the season 25–9, 14–4 in Mountain West play to win a share of the Mountain West regular season championship. They advanced to the semifinals of the Mountain West tournament where they lost to Wyoming. They received an at-large bid to the NCAA tournament where they lost in the First Four to Dayton.

Departures

Incoming Transfers

Recruiting

Roster

Schedule

The Mountain West released their conference schedule on June 24. Games may be moved to accommodate TV. Their full schedule was released on September 15.

|-
!colspan=9 style="background:#143D99; color:#FF6600;"| Exhibition

|-
!colspan=9 style="background:#143D99; color:#FF6600;"|Non-conference regular season

|-
!colspan=9 style="background:#143D99; color:#FF6600;"|Mountain West regular season

|-
!colspan=9 style="background:#143D99; color:#FF6600;"| Mountain West tournament

References

Boise State Broncos men's basketball seasons
Boise State
Boise
Boise